Black Rose is the second album by American singer-songwriter J. D. Souther, released in 1976. It includes Souther's version of "Faithless Love" released by Linda Ronstadt in 1974. Ronstadt would later cover "Simple Man, Simple Dream" and "Silver Blue" from this album.

Reception

In his retrospective review for Allmusic, critic William Ruhlmann called it an "excellent album steeped in the Southern California country-rock sound of the '70s". In a review for Rolling Stone, Stephen Holden wrote, "John David Souther’s second solo album benefits from a beautiful, all-star Peter Asher production. More sophisticated than either his first album or the two Souther-Hillman-Furay albums, Black Rose underscores Souther’s melodic writing, his strongest point, with some genuinely innovative arrangements by David Campbell, the classically trained musician who scored “Prisoner in Disguise" for Linda Ronstadt. "Silver Blue," much of which Campbell has scored as a duet for voice and plucked double bass and violas, is a starkly arresting production, while setting "Faithless Love" into a semiformal piece for voice, acoustic guitar and chamber ensemble transforms a prettier-than-average country-rock ballad into an eloquent one. "Doors Swing Open," a complex tune based on ninth and minor sixth chords, boasts an elegantly lush arrangement that both gives it shape and highlights its lovely chromaticism."

"Midnight Prowl" was a minor hit in Boston in 1976.

Track listing
All songs written by J. D. Souther.

"Banging My Head Against the Moon" – 3:41
"If You Have Crying Eyes" – 5:05
"Your Turn Now" – 3:48
"Faithless Love" – 3:33
"Baby Come Home" – 3:47
"Simple Man, Simple Dream" – 1:49
"Silver Blue" – 4:15
"Midnight Prowl" – 5:09
"Doors Swing Open" – 4:42
"Black Rose" – 3:56

Personnel

J. D. Souther – acoustic guitar, congas, ARP String Ensemble, lead vocals, backing vocals
Peter Asher – percussion, piano, electric piano, cabasa, shaker, vocals, backing vocals
James Bond – double bass
Michael Botts – drums
Donald Byrd – flugelhorn, horn
David Campbell – arranger, conductor, viola
Stanley Clarke – bass, double bass
Ronald Cooper – cello
David Crosby – vocals, backing vocals
Vincent De Rosa – horn, French horn
Ned Doheny – guitar, backing vocals
Chuck Domanico – bass
Robert Dubow – violin
David Duke – horn, French horn
Earl Dumler – flute, oboe
James Dunham – viola
Kenny Edwards – bass
Glenn Frey – guitar, electric guitar, electric piano, backing vocals
Art Garfunkel – vocals, backing vocals
Lowell George – guitar, slide guitar
Andrew Gold – guitar, piano, electric guitar, ARP String Ensemble, tambourine, vocals, backing vocals
Pamela Goldsmith – viola
John Guerin – drums
Don Henley – vocals, backing vocals
Dennis Karmazyn – cello
Ray Kelly – cello
Jim Keltner – drums
Danny "Kootch" Kortchmar – guitar, electric guitar
Russ Kunkel – drums
Kathleen Lenski – violin
Don Menza – flute
Roy Poper – flugelhorn, horn, French horn
Linda Ronstadt – vocals, backing vocals, harmony vocals, gut-string guitar
Sheldon Sanov – violin
Harry Shlutz – cello
Haim Shtrum – violin
Paul Stallworth – bass
Charles Veal – violin
Waddy Wachtel – electric guitar
Joe Walsh – guitar, slide guitar
John Wittenberg – violin

Production
Producer: Peter Asher
Engineers: Val Garay, Greg Ladanyi
Mastering: Doug Sax
Arranger: David Campbell
Direction: Elliot Roberts
Art Direction: Jimmy Wachtel
Design: Jimmy Wachtel
Photography: Lorrie Sullivan

Charts
Album – Billboard (North America)

References

J. D. Souther albums
1976 albums
Albums arranged by David Campbell (composer)
Albums produced by Peter Asher
Elektra Records albums
Albums with cover art by Jimmy Wachtel